Pain to Kill is the fifth studio album by Canadian country music artist Terri Clark. Released in the U.S. on Mercury Nashville in 2003, the album produced the singles "I Just Wanna Be Mad", "Three Mississippi" and "I Wanna Do It All". These respectively reached #2, #30, and #3 on the Billboard country charts.

"Not a Bad Thing" was later recorded by Trisha Yearwood on her 2007 album Heaven, Heartache and the Power of Love.

Track listing

Personnel

 Pat Buchanan – electric guitar
 Mark Casstevens – banjo
 Terri Clark – lead vocals
 J.T. Corenflos – electric guitar
 Stuart Duncan – fiddle, mandolin
 Paul Franklin – steel guitar
 Vince Gill – background vocals
 Kenny Greenberg – electric guitar
 Aubrey Haynie – fiddle
 Wes Hightower – background vocals
 John Hughey – steel guitar
 Hillary Lindsey – background vocals
 B. James Lowry – electric guitar
 Liana Manis – background vocals
 Brent Mason – electric guitar
 Steve Nathan – keyboards
 Gary Prim – piano
 John Wesley Ryles – background vocals
 Leslie Satcher – background vocals
 Keith Stegall – harmonica
 Bruce Watkins – banjo
 Biff Watson – acoustic guitar
 Lonnie Wilson – drums
 Glenn Worf – bass guitar
 Jonathan Yudkin – fiddle

Charts

Weekly charts

Year-end charts

References

2003 albums
Mercury Nashville albums
Terri Clark albums
Albums produced by Byron Gallimore
Albums produced by Keith Stegall